The Sbanț is a right tributary of the river Jijioara in Romania. It flows into the Jijioara in Larga-Jijia.

References

Rivers of Romania
Rivers of Iași County